Rutsiro is a district (akarere) in Western Province, Rwanda. Its headquarter is located in Gihango sector.

About Rutsiro  
Rutsiro District is one of the seven Districts making up the Western Province , located 150 km the capital Kigali. It has a population of 324,654 of which 60% are below 25 years, and a population density of 281 inhabitants per km² by 2012. This District is made up of 13 administrative Sectors, 62 Cells and 483 villages commonly known as “Imidugudu” covering a surface area of 1157.3 km².

Geography  

In the East: From North to South, the limit of the District of Rutsiro leaves the banks of rivers Bihongora and Nyanzo until the limit of Kavumu sector in  Ngororero  District

In the West: From the South to the North, the limits of Rutsiro District is confused with the border between Rwanda and the Democratic Republic of Congo. Rutsiro begins from the border with Karongi District and continues up to the border that it shares with Rubavu District on Lake Kivu. 

In the South: From the West to the East, the District of Rutsiro shares a border with the Northern limits of Karongi District from the border with the Republic of Rwanda and the Democratic republic of Congo where the Districts of Rutsiro and Karongi meet on Lake Kivu up to where the Districts of Rutsiro, Ngororero and Karongi meet towards the East.

Tourism 

Rutsiro has many touristic site one of which is Gishwati - Mukura National Park which is a protected reserve in the north-western part of Rwanda, not far from Lake Kivu. 

Rutsiro has also the lock named "Urutare rw'Abakobwa" meaning "the lock for girls", which has a long cultural history behind it. Alongside the Lake Kivu, there are many tiny beaches between mountains.

References 
 
 Inzego.doc — Province, District and Sector information from MINALOC, the Rwanda ministry of local government.

Western Province, Rwanda
Districts of Rwanda